Kel is a village in Neelum Valley,  Azad Kashmir, Pakistan.

Transport 
Buses run daily between Muzaffarabad and Kel.

A bus service also runs from Rawalpindi to Kel.

Facilities 
Private hotels and a rest house, run by AJK Tourism and Archaeology Department, are available for tourists. It has a branch of Habib Bank Limited, boys and girls degree colleges, Tehsil Headquarter hospital and a bazaar.

See also 
Taobat
Sharda
Keran
Kutton

References

External links 
 Hotel Bookings

Hill stations in Pakistan
2005 Kashmir earthquake
Populated places in Neelam District
Tourist attractions in Azad Kashmir